Cao Quỳnh Cư (1888–1929) was one of the founder figures of the Vietnamese religion Cao Đài, participating with Phạm Công Tắc and Cao Hoài Sang in the first Hội Yến Diêu Trì to Đạo Mẫu in 1925.

References

Vietnamese Caodaists
1888 births
1929 deaths